Paul ("Tish") Tichelaar (born November 13, 1982 in Edmonton, Alberta) was a member of the 2006 Canadian National Triathlon team for Olympic distance triathlon. He has competed in events such as the 2006 Commonwealth Games, the 2005 and 2006 World Triathlon Championships and many ITU World Cup races. In 2006 he won the U-23 national Championship race in Kelowna, British Columbia and the Pan American Cup race in Caledon, Ontario.  He completed his degree in electrical engineering from the University of Alberta in 2005.

In June 2008, Tichelaar was named to the 2008 Summer Olympics team.

References
Profile

1982 births
Living people
Canadian people of Dutch descent
Canadian male triathletes
Commonwealth Games competitors for Canada
Olympic triathletes of Canada
Pan American Games competitors for Canada
Sportspeople from Edmonton
Triathletes at the 2003 Pan American Games
Triathletes at the 2007 Pan American Games
Triathletes at the 2008 Summer Olympics
Triathletes at the 2006 Commonwealth Games